Elizabeth Lake is an unincorporated community in Oakland County in the U.S. state of Michigan.  The community is located within Waterford Township.  As an unincorporated community, Elizabeth Lake has no legally defined area or population statistics of its own, and it uses the Waterford 48328 ZIP Code.

Post office
In 1834, the first post office was established in Waterford Township on the north shore of Elizabeth Lake.  It was named Lake Elizabeth Post Office.

Its first postmaster was an American Revolutionary War veteran named William Terry (b.1760-d.1840), who came to Michigan in 1824.

The post office was closed in 1841.

Namesake
Elizabeth Lake was named for the nearby lake, which was named for Elizabeth Cass, the wife of Territorial Governor of Michigan Lewis Cass.

Lake
The body of water named Elizabeth Lake is located south of Elizabeth Lake Road, north of Cass–Elizabeth Road, east of Cooley Lake Road, and west of Cass Lake Road.

See also

References

External links

Unincorporated communities in Michigan
Unincorporated communities in Oakland County, Michigan
Metro Detroit
Populated places established in 1834
1834 establishments in Michigan Territory